Christopher Adam Bumstead (born 2 February 1995) is a Canadian IFBB professional bodybuilder. Bumstead is the reigning Mr. Olympia Classic Physique winner, having won the competition in 2019, 2020, 2021 and 2022. He was also the runner-up in 2017 and 2018. He is often referred to by his nickname Cbum.

Bumstead maintains a large online presence with content focusing on his lifestyle and bodybuilding.

Early life 
Bumstead was born and raised in Canada's capital city of Ottawa, Ontario. He was involved in multiple sports in high school including fencing, football, baseball, basketball, and hockey. He started weightlifting at the age of 14, and between the ninth and twelfth grade, he went from 170 to 225 pounds, growing his legs the most. After building what he thought was a good physique, Bumstead met his sister's boyfriend, professional bodybuilder Iain Valliere, who has coached him since. On October 19, 2022, Chris and Iain formally announced they will no longer be working together in order to both focus on their own Mr. Olympia shows.

Career 
Growing up, bodybuilding was only a hobby for Bumstead. Chris played many sports, ranging from soccer to baseball, basketball, and ice hockey. This developed Bumstead's love for the gym, as he got into weightlifting his freshman year of high school. When Chris met his sister's boyfriend, Iain Valliere, he quickly saw the potential Chris held and helped him capitalize on it. Iain helped develop Chris and got him ready to compete by 2014. After bodybuilding goals began to stack up, "All of a sudden, I was coming second at the Olympia,” he stated. Bumstead's first bodybuilding show was a regional level show in Ontario which he participated with his sister, Melissa Valliere. They both won the overall, Bumstead winning as a junior. Chris found himself in love with the sport of bodybuilding after his first show. He knew this was his calling and that he had what it takes to compete at the highest level. He started to work with Iain first hand, and devoted his life to the sport.

Bumstead made his competitive debut at age 19 in 2014 and obtained his IFBB pro card at age 21 after claiming the 2016 IFBB North American Bodybuilding Championship. Chris impressed the crowd and judges in his first Mr Olympia back in 2017, taking second place in the Classic Physique category. The results were the same for Bumstead in the 2018 Olympia competition, except his conditioning was worse compared to the previous year. Chris was hospitalized 4 weeks out from the 2018 competition due to severe water retention in his body. He spent three nights in the emergency room, and was given a strong diuretic to flush out potassium due to a kidney issue. Eventually, Chris was released and could continue to train, but this was a huge setback.

Bumstead rose to international fame as he reached the top of the podium in 2019, 2020, 2021 and 2022, making him the current reigning champion in Men's Classic Physique.

Contest history 

 2016 IFBB North American Championships, Heavyweight, 1st (earned IFBB pro card)
2016 IFBB Dayana Cadeau Classic, Classic Physique, 3rd
 2017 IFBB Pittsburgh Pro, Classic Physique, 1st
 2017 IFBB Toronto Pro, Classic Physique, 1st
 2017 Mr. Olympia, Classic Physique, 2nd
 2018 Mr. Olympia, Classic Physique, 2nd
 2019 Mr. Olympia, Classic Physique, 1st
 2020 Mr. Olympia, Classic Physique, 1st
 2021 Mr. Olympia, Classic Physique, 1st
 2022 Mr. Olympia, Classic Physique, 1st

References 

1995 births
Living people
Canadian bodybuilders
Professional bodybuilders
Sportspeople from Ottawa
Bodybuilding